The Trout Inn (often simply referred to as The Trout) is a historic pub in Lower Wolvercote north of Oxford, close to Godstow Bridge, directly by the River Thames.

Media and celebrities

The pub features in Evelyn Waugh's novel Brideshead Revisited and in Colin Dexter's Inspector Morse series, which was written and filmed in and around Oxford. For example, it appears in the TV episode "The Wolvercote Tongue". An alternative reality version also appears in Philip Pullman's La Belle Sauvage. It also appears in the 1997 film version of The Saint.  In 2001 the Trout Inn was visited by US President Bill Clinton and his daughter Chelsea, who was then a graduate student at University College, Oxford.

Architecture
The Trout Inn is a Grade II listed building built principally in the 17th century, with some 18th-century alterations and additions. Godstow Bridge, to the south of the inn, consists of two stone arches across the Thames, the northern one dating from medieval times, and the southern rebuilt in 1892. Both bridges are also Grade II listed, as is the wooden footbridge at the Trout Inn.

See also
The Perch, Binsey
Victoria Arms, Marston

References

External links
The Trout Inn
Oxford Restaurant Guide information

Grade II listed pubs in Oxfordshire
Buildings and structures on the River Thames